Pat Sheehan (born 28 May 1958) is an Irish Sinn Féin politician, and former Provisional Irish Republican Army hunger striker at the Maze Prison.

Hunger strike
Sheehan was born in Belfast, Northern Ireland. In 1978 he was convicted of causing an explosion and sentenced to 15 years.

Sheehan was the 17th republican inmate at the Maze Prison to join the 1981 hunger strikes, which was aimed at gaining political status for Provisional IRA and Irish National Liberation Army prisoners. He began fasting on 10 August – after nine prisoners had already died – and ended when the hunger strike was officially called off on 3 October. He survived 55 days without food.

By the time Sheehan began fasting, the strike had already begun to break. Another protester, Paddy Quinn, was taken off the hunger strike on 31 July after his mother called for medical intervention when her son was close to death following 47 days without food. This action – and calls by the Catholic Church to end the strike – prompted other relatives to do the same. The last prisoner to die was Michael Devine, who died on 20 August after 60 days. The hunger strike was ultimately called off after it had become clear that nearly all the prisoners' families would intervene to stop their sons from dying.

He was released in 1987, but was convicted again in 1989 for more bombing offences and sentenced to 24 years. He was released under the terms of the 1998 Belfast Agreement.

On 3 October 2006, Sheehan marked the 25th anniversary of the end of the hunger strike by reading the prisoners' statement that ended the protest outside the gates of the now closed Maze Prison.

Political career
On 7 December 2010, he succeeded Gerry Adams as MLA for Belfast West, Adams having resigned to contest the 2011 Irish general election. Sheehan retained the seat for Sinn Féin at the 2011 Assembly election.

Sheehan has provoked anger and controversy by describing the Troubles as "probably quite civilised" and saying the IRA "could have left a 1,000lb car bomb on the Shankill" if it wanted to kill Protestants.

As at August 2015, he is a Political Member of the Northern Ireland Policing Board.

Personal life
Pat Sheehan is the widower of Sinn Féin activist Siobhán O'Hanlon who died from cancer in 2006. He has a son. Pat is also a keen cricket fan.

References

1958 births
Irish republicans
Living people
Northern Ireland MLAs 2007–2011
Northern Ireland MLAs 2011–2016
Northern Ireland MLAs 2016–2017
Northern Ireland MLAs 2017–2022
People educated at St Malachy's College
Politicians from Belfast
Provisional Irish Republican Army members
Republicans imprisoned during the Northern Ireland conflict
Sinn Féin MLAs
Irish hunger strikers
Northern Ireland MLAs 2022–2027